Callum G. Brown (born 6 April 1953) is a Scottish historian and author.

He specialises in the history of secularisation, Christianity, and organised humanism in the United Kingdom.

Life 

He was born on 6 April 1953.

He was born and raised in Edinburgh, Scotland.

He currently resides in Scotland.

Career 

He is currently a professor of history at the University of Glasgow. He has had previous posts at both Dundee University and the University of Strathclyde.
In 2020 he celebrated his 30th year in the industry. .

He has frequently collaborated with Arthur McIvor.

Bibliography 

His books have received mostly positive reviews. Some of his notable books are:

 The Death of Christian Britain: Understanding Secularisation, 1800-2000 
 Postmodernism for Historians 
 Britain Since 1707 
 Religion and Society in Twentieth-Century Britain 
 The People In The Pews: Religion And Society In Scotland Since 1780 
 The University Experience 1945-1975: An Oral History of the University of Strathclyde 
 Becoming Atheist: Humanism and the Secular West
 The Battle for Christian Britain: Sex, Humanists and Secularisation, 1945-1980

References

External links
 Glasgow University 
 Edinburgh University Press 

20th-century Scottish historians
Living people
1953 births
Scottish male writers
21st-century Scottish historians
20th-century British male writers
21st-century British male writers
Writers from Glasgow
Alumni of the University of Glasgow
Historians of Christianity
British historians of religion